Susie Tharu (born 1943) is an Indian writer, publisher, professor, editor and women's activist. Throughout her career and the founding of several women's activist organizations, Tharu has helped to highlight those issues in India.

Career

Tharu as a writer earned her membership on the executive committee for Anveshi, an Indian research group dedicated to feminist-theory, where she also served as secretary. She has been a part of the Suabaltern Studies editorial since 1992. She served on the Board of Advisors for The Feminist Press, where she was also a publisher. She has taught in the Department of Humanities and Social Sciences at Indian Institute of Technology Delhi and in Kanpur. Most recently, she and a few others, like K. Lalita, Rama Melkote, Uma Brughubanda and Dr. Veena Shatrugna founded Stree Shakti Sanghatana (SSS)  and Anveshi, two women's activist groups. She edited two volumes of dossier on Dalit writings from South India that focus on the resurgence of Dalit politics in the 1990s.

In addition, Tharu has served on the Advisory Panels of BODHI Centre for Dalit Bahujan Initiatives since 2003, and as a trustee for the Centre for Studies in Culture and Society in Bangalore since its inception. She has served on the Advisory Committee on National Biography for the National Book Trust, served as member of the Governing Council at the Nehru Memorial Museum and Library in New Delhi, as a trustee of the India Foundation for the Arts in Bangalore, and as a member of the Joint Committee for South Asia, Social Science Research Council in New York.

Tharu retired as professor of the English and Foreign Languages University, Hyderabad, India. She was employed since 1973, serving as an English Literature Teacher, a Professor of English Literature, and a Coordinator/Professor for the School of Critical Humanities. She is currently Eminent Professor, Department of Cultural Studies. Both her research and teaching focus on feminism, issues of minority, literary and visual arts, and social medicine. In total, Tharu has published six books on these topics. Her most well known work which she edited with K. Lalitha is the two-part anthology titled Women Writing In India, 600 B.C. Her works are most well known for their critical viewpoint on the Indian women's movement and cultural theory.

Activism
In 1978 she helped to found Sthri Shakti Sangatana (SSS-Women Power Organization), an organization whose main focus was women. The group consisted of women active in the Maoist Party. Through this organization, Tharu helped to stop the vegetable export which affected housewives, vegetable vendors, and middle-class women.  The organization also has raised question about the Rape Law through a series of street performances and public campaigns.

Later, Tharu helped to found Anveshi Research Centre for Women's Studies. The organization was founded after SSS, when the ambitions of that organization grew too large for her. The organization was grown from the members of SSS and many still retain membership in both. The new organization, Anveshi, is based on research, critical reflection, and activism surrounding our current historical moment. The organization looks to explore feminist theory and ways of understanding issues in education, Dalits and minorities, development studies, health and healthcare systems, legal studies, and the public domain. The centre is located in Hyderabad, India. Tharu has expressed that Anveshi is very interested in connecting feminist thinking and other thinking, as well as exploring why feminism does not easily invite Muslim or Dalit women. This organization also does a large number of translations of Women's writing in India.

Honors and awards
1962-65: Uganda Government Merit Scholarship, Makerere College, Uganda
1994-96: Jawaharlal Nehru Fellowship

Publications

References

1943 births
Living people
Indian feminist writers
20th-century Indian women writers
20th-century Indian writers
Indian women's rights activists
Academic staff of the Indian Institutes of Technology
Jawaharlal Nehru Fellows
Academic staff of the English and Foreign Languages University